Maharathi is a Hindi thriller film produced by Dhilin Mehta. The film was directed by Shivam Nair and stars Paresh Rawal, Neha Dhupia, Naseeruddin Shah, Boman Irani, Om Puri and Tara Sharma. The film's music is by Shibani Kashyap. The film is based on the Gujarati language 
play of the same name.

Plot
The film opens as Jai Singh Adenwaala becomes involved in an accident due to drunk driving but is saved from death by Subhash Sharma. As Jai Singh is seriously drunk, Subhash hails a taxi and decides to drop him home. Once at the Adenwaala Bungalow, Jai Singh invites Subhash inside to thank him. He introduces him to his wife, Malika a glamorous but shady young lady and his lawyer and friend, AD Merchant. He then ends up hiring Subhash as his chauffeur, much to the chagrin of Mallika. Merchant also develops a dislike for him. Malika tries her best to get Subhash out of the house but Subhash's cleverness and quick wit saves him every time.

As Subhash spends time with the Adenwaala couple, he discovers Malika's to intentions, to kill Jai Singh in order to get the 24 crore of his insurance claim. This is further proved when Malika throws Jai Singh's asthma inhaler out of the window when he needed it. This time Jai Singh is saved by Subhash once again as he gets him the inhaler just in time.

It is revealed that Adenwaala is neck deep in loans and very depressed due to his constant drinking and Malika's desperate attempts to kill him. He calls Subhash and Malika and hands Subhash a letter. He then tells Malika about a little change he had made in his insurance policy. According to the conditions in the policy, the insurance money could only be claimed if Jai Singh is murdered and not if he kills himself. Jai Singh says that he knows Malika will try to make his suicide appear to be murder. Saying this, he shoots himself. Malika rushes to call the police but Subhash convinces her that together they can prove his suicide a murder. Subhash offers to collaborate with her on the condition that they will split the insurance money in half. Mallika initially hesitates but later accepts Subhash's offer. Then they decide to hide Jai Singh's body in the freezer to stop it from decaying, the Subhash plan a way to prove the suicide is a murder on his way to execute the plan Malika is killed in an accident. Subhash now uses his wits to claim the insurance money for himself, succeeds, and then he leads a luxurious life with Jai Singh's money

Cast
 Paresh Rawal as Subhash Sharma
 Neha Dhupia as Mallika Adenwalla
 Tara Sharma as Swati
 Boman Irani as AD Merchant
 Om Puri as ACP Gokhale
 Naseeruddin Shah as Jaisingh Adenwalla

References

External links
 

2008 films
2000s Hindi-language films
Films based on British novels
Films based on works by James Hadley Chase
Indian thriller drama films

Films scored by Shibani Kashyap